is a Japanese internet entrepreneur best known for being the founder of the most accessed Japanese message board, 2channel, and current administrator of 4chan. He is also a self-help author and TV personality. He is often known by his given name, which he uses, rendered intentionally in lowercase, both as a pen name and as a username.

Until February 2013, he was a director of, and advisor to, Niwango, best known for its video-sharing service Nico Nico Douga.

Christopher Poole, the founder of 4chan, formally announced on 21 September 2015, that he had sold the website to Nishimura. Nishimura's tenure as administrator of 4chan has been described by former moderators as letting a moderator known as RapeApe, who strongly dissuade banning users for racism and bigotry, have full control of the site, while simultaneously firing left-wing moderators. After a dispute with 2channel's hosting provider, Nishimura no longer administrates 2channel, but instead operates a competitor to it, 2ch.sc.

Career 
Nishimura was born in Sagamihara, Kanagawa, but raised in Tokyo. He founded Tokyo Access LP in 1998. In May 1999, he opened 2channel while he was studying at the University of Central Arkansas. In June 2001, he founded Irregulars and Partners KK with Ichirō Yamamoto, which was involved in 2channel's management, but later left.

He graduated with a degree in literature from Chuo University in 2000.

In January 2007, Nishimura was an advisor to Skip-Up KK, CEO of Tokyo Plus KK, co-founder of  KK, and a director of Niwango, the company that launched Nico Nico Douga. He left his role at Niwango in February 2013.

2channel 

During 2008, 2ch generated an annual revenue upwards of ¥100 million for Nishimura. The site was also run by 300 "volunteer administrators" who received no pay. Nishimura justified this with the comment, "I don't think that's all that different from some dude who opens a convenience store in front of a train station. They can make a million yen a day."

In August 2013, an accidental leak placed the credit card details of thousands of 2channel users into the public domain, and this event resulted in a series of lawsuits against the website. Around the same time, the anti-matome movement took place throughout 2channel, a controversial community development involving users protesting against  which specialize in summarizing 2channel threads, which were taking away site traffic.

On 19 February 2014, Jim Watkins, as chairman of N.T. Technology, Inc., 2channel's domain registrar, seized 2channel's domain. He took full control over the website, relieved Nishimura of all power, and assumed the role of website administrator. Watkins claimed that Nishimura had failed to pay him money owed which led to the seizure as a way to cover Nishimura's debts, while Nishimura claimed that he had in fact paid everything owed and that the domain transfer was an illegal domain hijacking. In a Q&A session on 4chan shortly after becoming the site's owner, Nishimura claimed that 2channel was stolen by Watkins.

In October 2017, Watkins renamed 2channel to 5channel and transferred it to Loki Technology Inc. to avoid legal complications.

4chan

On 21 September 2015, he bought the website 4chan from Christopher Poole. The amount paid has not been disclosed, but The New York Times has reported that the sale was made possible with funds provided by three Japanese investors.

Users on 4chan refer to him commonly as 'hiro' but also by the ethnic slurs "gook moot" or "Hiroshima Nagasaki", "Jackie  4chan", or simply "hiroshimoot".

Lawsuits

As defendant 

Nishimura has lost a number of libel lawsuits which have led to him being assessed a considerable amount in penalties. In 2008, he told Wired he has no intention of paying, saying, "If the verdict mandates deleting things, I'll do it," but, "I just haven't complied with demands to pay money. Would a cell phone carrier feel responsible when somebody receives a threatening phone call?"

As plaintiff 

Nishimura has filed a number of lawsuits against Jim Watkins in connection with his allegation that 2channel was illegally seized. He has attempted to repossess the domain both through WIPO's Uniform Domain-Name Dispute-Resolution Policy and through the Japanese court system. Through the Japan Patent Office, Nishimura owns the trademark "2channel", though the WIPO refused to intervene on his behalf on account of that, suggesting the parties go to court instead as it was not, in its view, a case of "cybersquatting" but rather a "business dispute".

Personal life 
Nishimura is married. As of May 2019, he lives in Paris, to which he moved in 2015.

Bibliography

Cited

Footnotes

Notes

References

Further reading

External links 
 
 
 hiroyuki on YouTube

1976 births
Living people
People from Sagamihara
People from Tokyo
2channel
Chuo University alumni
4chan
Japanese YouTubers
University of Central Arkansas alumni
Japanese expatriates in France